Musical Sources is a series of recordings of traditional music that was made for the International Music Council by the International Institute for Comparative Music Studies and Documentation (Berlin/Venice) and released on the Philips label.  Most of these recordings were later reissued on the Auvidis label.  The series was directed by Alain Daniélou.  It was part of the larger UNESCO Collection series.

Recordings

References

Traditional music